{{Infobox book series
| name = The Nevermoor Series
| image = 
| books = 
| author = Jessica Townsend
| illustrator = 
| cover_artist = Beatriz Castro
| country = Australia
| language = English
| genre = Fantasy, children's literature
| publisher = Little, Brown
| pub_date = October 10, 2017 - present
| media_type = PaperbackHardcover
| number_of_books = 3
}}The Nevermoor series is a book series written by Australian  author Jessica Townsend and published by Little, Brown and Company.  The series centers around Morrigan Crow, a cursed child living in the Wintersea Republic. When it comes time for her to die on Eventide day, she is "whisked away" to the city of Nevermoor by Jupiter North, a hotel owner and part of the Wundrous Society, a prestigious group of units, each member with a "knack," a small superpower that allows them to be better than average. In 2017, film rights to Nevermoor: The Trials of Morrigan Crow were sold to Fox Broadcasting Company, with Drew Goddard set to produce the movie and write the screenplay. All three books have been released to rave reviews, praising the plot, character development and characterization, and themes, which include magic and humor. Kirkus Reviews said about the first installment in the series, "[it's] not genre-shattering but a solid read for genre fans."

All three existing books in the series have been adapted into Audiobook format, having been read by Gemma Whelan. Nevermoor: The Trials of Morrigan Crow was published by Little, Brown and Company on October 10, 2017 in Australia and October 31, 2017 in the United States, with the cover art having been done by Jim Madsen. The next book, Wundersmith: The Calling of Morrigan Crow, was released on October 30 and November 13, 2018, in Australia and the U.S., respectively. After a delayed late 2019, and later early 2020 release date, Hollowpox: The Hunt for Morrigan Crow was published on September 29, 2020 in Australia, October 15, 2020 in the United Kingdom, and October 27, 2020 in the United States. The fourth book, Silverborn: The Mystery of Morrigan Crow, is set to be released in October 2023.

 Setting 
The series is set mostly in two locations: the city of Jackalfax, in the Wintersea Republic, and the titular city of Nevermoor, in the free state. Jackalfax, where Morrigan was born and grew up in her childhood home Crow Manor, was founded sometime in the ninth age of the Wintersea Republic, as remarked by Morrigan early in the series. The streets and neighbourhood of the city are neat and orderly, with houses that all look similar and prestigious schools. Nevermoor itself is divided into 27 boroughs, which are further divided into quadrants. In addition to humans and animals, Nevermoor contains Wunimals, which are part animal (called "unnimals" in universe) and part human. Locations in Nevermoor include Proudfoot House, part of the Wunsoc campus where the Elders and the three schools reside; the Hotel Deucalion, the famously successful hotel in which Jupiter, Morrigan, and several others live; the Nevermoorian Opera House, a theatre in which both Dame Chanda Kali and the Angel Israfel have performed; and the Trollosseum, a sports arena used multiple times for different purposes across the series.

Nevermoor contains two law-inforcement forces: the regular police force, pegged "The Stink," and the Wundrous Society Investigate Department, which is known as "The Stealth." Celebrations throughout the year include Hallowmas and Christmas, and, every Friday in the summer, a festive market called the Nevermoor Bazaar. Two prominent hospitals exist in Nevermoor, one being a Wundrous- Society-run facility (the Nevermoor Teaching Hospital) and one outside of the society, the Royal Lightwing Hospital. Nevermoor is home also to many "geographic oddities," including Swindleroads, Tricksy Lanes, and Shadowstreets. The River Juro runs through Nevermoor and freezes over during the winter. The Wunderground is a public transportation system running underground and is powered by Wunder, and the Brolly Rail is a Wundrous Society mode of transportation that requires umbrellas to use and is apparently quite dangerous.

In the fictional city of Nevermoor, citizens have come to hate Wundersmiths, even though the ones who came before the villainous Ezra Squall created great things. Examples include a beautiful skyscraper made out of water and an amusement park only available to children who deserve it. After Ezra Squall massacred the other Wundersmiths and innocent citizens, he was banished from Nevermoor. He became immortal after, resolving to hunt down all the other Wundersmiths, wanting to keep all the Wunder to himself. Morrigan, a Wundersmith herself, escaped his Hunt of Smoke and Shadow. However, it is revealed that Morrigan escaping is all part of his plan.

 Series overview 

 Nevermoor 

In the beginning of the book, cursed ten-year-old Morrigan Crow is set to die on Eventide day. On the night Morrigan is said to die, Jupiter North from the mystical city Nevermoor comes to rescue her from the Hunt of Smoke and Shadow, which hunts cursed children, and inserts her in a contest that to determine the next new member of the Wundrous society. Morrigan, though concerned that she apparently does not have a "knack" or little power, passes the first half of the first trial, the Book Trial, easily, but on the next portion of the quiz, about Nevemoorian history, Morrigan struggles and just barely passes. In the Chase Trial, Morrigan must race on a steed against 300 kids and hit one of only 150 targets. Morrigan is about to win, and claim the ultimate prize: an invitation to a prestigious dinner hosted by the Elders of Nevermoor themselves, but she stops to help a young girl, Cadence, who fell off her own animal, but Cadence steals the prize from her and she passes on a technicality. While at a Hallowmas festival called the Black Parade, Morrigan stops to help and old lady who has fallen down into a sewer, and the lady turns out to be a witch, who introduces her to the Fright Trial, the scariest challenge of them all.

Morrigan passes the Fright Trial with help from her friend, Hawthorne, and meets Cadence again along the way. When it is time for the Show Trial, where contenders showcase their knacks for the Elders, Morrigan believes that she will lose, but Jupiter tells the Elders something and she actually passes. When the trials are over, an officer named Inspector Flintlock confronts Jupiter, saying that now Morrigan completed the trials, she is eligible to be deported since she was brought to Nevermoor illegally. Jupiter convinces the Elders to give him until Inauguration Day to come up with nine signatories on the legal papers that would allow Morrigan to stay. While riding home on a train, Morrigan is kidnapped by the infamous Ezra Squall, a man who can control the mysterious, magical substance of Wunder and massacred Nevermoor 100 years ago. Squall informs her that all the cursed children who were born on Eventide, including Morrigan, were Wundersmiths, and he send the Hunt of Smoke and Shadow after them so they wouldn't use up too much of his precious Wunder, though Morrigan having lived was no accident.

 Wundersmith 

Jupiter finds a ninth signatory for Morrigan's legal papers, and learns that a great singer named Cassiel has mysteriously disappeared. Meanwhile, Morrigan does not feel that she fits in with the others in Unit 919, and some of the patrons think she should not even be in the Wundrous Society at all. Later, after discovering a new room which has appeared in her hotel room overnight which leads to Unit 919's private train station, Morrigan and the rest of Unit 919 are given a tour by their train conductor, Miss Cheery, where they meet the Scholar Mistress of the Wundrous Society's schooling division. They are also told that the schooling is split into two sections: the Mundane Arts and the Arcane Arts. Morrigan is in the Mundane Arts section. After learning that another important Wundrous Society figure, Paximus Luck, has gone missing, Morrigan begins to worry, a feeling that gets increased when she is put in only one class, that lasts all day, in which she learns about all the heinous crimes committed by past Wundersmiths. Jupiter makes her feel better and arranges another class for her, about navigating the crazy and "ridiculous" streets of Nevermoor. Later, after an encounter with a group of bullies, Morrigan develops a theory that all the people who have gone missing could have been taken to the Ghastly Market, an illegal black market where can buy things like weapons, or even human beings.

The bullies return, and Morrigan accidentally lets out a blast of fire to keep them from hurting her, getting her in major trouble, then banned from Wunsoc campus so she has to take classes at the Hotel Deucalion. Meanwhile, mysterious notes keep appearing for Unit 919, saying that the unit must meet certain demands or they will "reveal the terrible truth about Unit 919." The unit becomes frantic to meet the requests, but eventually blames their misfortune on Morrigan, thinking that the terrible truth is Morrigan's being a Wundersmith. Morrigan has a brief encounter with the Ghastly Market itself, and she discovers that it actually is real. Afterwards, she gets reaccepted back into the society after the staff of the Hotel Deucalion purposefully annoy Professor Onstald throughout his stay. Morrigan gets lost and ends up meeting Squall, who shows her how to control Wunder. On Hallowmas, Squall comes to Morrigan again, telling her that her friends—along with Onstald and the Angel Israfel—are in danger of being sold on the Ghastly Market. Morrigan and Hawthorne save them, but Onstald stays behind, sacrificing himself so the others can survive. Later, at a Wundrous Society gathering, Morrigan reveals herself as a Wundersmith as per the last of blackmail demand, and the Elders reveal that the blackmailing was all a test to see if Morrigan could work together with the rest of Unit 919 well.

 Hollowpox 
On the last day of their first year in the Wundrous Society, the members of Unit 919 partake in a class called Containment & Distraction, as an intro to the harder class they will have to take the following year. Later, across the time of about a month, Wunimals begin attacking, including a time when Morrigan spends time with Hawthorne at a parade. Afterwards, Fenestra picks Morrigan up and she senses her acting unusual. At a Christmas dinner, Dame Chanda Kali reveals that her favorite fashion designer was a Wunimal who looked similar, and the hotel staff–Morrigan included—begin to worry. Later, during her first day of school of the New Year, a new teacher, Rosenfeld, confronts Morrigan and takes her to the School of Wundrous Arts, where anyone can train in skills like Professor Onstald's to stop time, and learn about Wundersmiths. Morrigan meets her fellow students, Conall and Sofia. Later, Morrigan is threatened by a rabid Bearwun and Dame Chanda Kali is attacked by a Horsewun. Morrigan keeps noticing a strange green light in their eyes as they go crazy. Dame Chanda explains that only a few decades ago, Wunimals were treated as less than human, as if they had the intelligence of a common house pet. In the Wundrous Society, Wunimals are warned of the virus that infects only them, causing them to act aggressively and become catatonic and "hollow," which is also dubbed "Hollowpox." When the society's condition worsens, Jupiter and Jack are put to work using their Witness powers to find infected Wunimals.

Meanwhile, Unit 919 is forced to continue classes, with Morrigan retreating more and more often to the School of Wundrous Arts, where she finds a book, The Book of Ghostly Hours, where she can relive experiences and lessons of Wundersmiths of the past, who really weren't all evil. Laurent St. James, leader of the Concerned Citizens of Nevermoor, begins pounding the Wunimals in the press, saying they should be locked up together or banned from city establishment, much to Morrigan, Jupiter, and the rest of the Hotel Deucalion staff’s horror. When Holliday Wu and the Elders anonymously reveal her Wundersmith abilities to the non-Wundrous Society public, St. James switches to her, provoking newspapers to claim that she is not an actual Wundersmith, and offers a large reward to anybody who can photograph her using her abilities. Morrigan tracks Hollowpox back to President Wintersea from the Wintersea Republic, named Maud Lowry. Lowry admits that her state has developed a Hollowpox cure, and promises Morrigan that she will try to distribute the cure across Nevermoor and the Free State, but Squall comes to her and warns him that Lowry was the one who commissioned his to create the virus. He helps Morrigan destroy the virus, and some of the Wunimals wake up. Once Morrigan finds out that not all of the Wunimals were cured, she summons Squall and he uses wunder through her to revive all the comatose Wunimals at the expense of Morrigan becoming his apprentice.

 Characters 

 Introduced in book 1 
 Morrigan Crow is the main character of the series. She was born on Eventide, the last day of the age in the Wintersea Republic, where she grew up. The people in the city considered her cursed, as during every new age in the Wintersea Republic, Wundersmith Ezra Squall secretly sends out his skeletal Hunt of Smoke and Shadow to kill every cursed child, as they are Wundersmiths too and he is scared that they will use up all his precious Wunder. Morrigan's family resents her for her curse, especially her father, a powerful politician who sees Morrigan as a burden on his career. Upon becoming part of the Wundrous Society's Unit 919, Morrigan feels she does not fit in with the rest of the unit when they start acting strangely around her.
 Jupiter North rescues Morrigan from her terrible fate on Eventide. He is a member of the Wundrous Society, and often goes on adventures as a part of the League of Explorers. In Wundersmith: The Calling of Morrigan Crow, Jupiter is forced to attend these missions more frequently, and he feels bad that he is not around for Morrigan. Jupiter is the uncle of Jack Arjuna Korrapati, and is the owner or the Deucalion Hotel, where he works and lives. Jupiter is a Witness, meaning that his knack allows him to see the truth in everything he sees or hears.
 Hawthorne Swift is Morrigan's best friend in books two and three and towards the end of book one. Hawthorne meets Morrigan through the Wundrous Society's trials, in which he also competes. As a dragon rider, Hawthorne was immediately accepted into the society after the Show Trial after demonstrating  his powers to the Elders. Hawthorne has an older brother, by the name of Homer, who took a vow of silence and now wears a blackboard around his neck on which he writes comments and questions for his family to read.
 Ezra Squall is known as the Last Wundersmith, who lived one hundred years ago. He disgraced the name of the Wundersmiths and Nevermoor when he massacred most of the city on Courage Square. Since then, he became somewhat of an immortal monster, forever gathering forces to invade the city from which he was banished. In Nevermoor: The Trials of Morrigan Crow, after Morrigan is accepted into the Wundrous Society, Squall comes to her and tells her she is a Wundersmith. Following that, Squall tries to get Morrigan to join him and let him train her, but after a few lessons from the madman, she opts to take Squall's advice and learn the Wretched Arts, but instead chooses to learn them from her Wundrous Society teacher, the Scholar Mistress.
 Corvus Crow is Morrigan's father from the Wintersea Republic. As an important political figure who often represented the country, Corvus saw Morrigan as a nuisance and bad luck for his career. In the beginning of Nevermoor: The Trials of Morrigan Crow, Corvus cannot wait for Eventide when Morrigan is destined to die so that his life can be back to normal. After Morrigan's mother's death, Corvus remarries. He and his new wife, Ivy Crow (née unknown), have twins, Guntram and Wolfram, whom Morrigan sees when she visits Wintersea later in the book.
John Arjuna Korrapati is Jupiter's nephew who prefers to go by the name of Jack. In Nevermoor: The Trials of Morrigan Crow, he comes to stay with his uncle at the Hotel Deucalion and immediately takes a disliking to the girl. However, near the end of the book, Jack and Morrigan are able to kindle a friendship. Jack is a Witness, like Jupiter, and is able to see the truth in everything. In book two, Wundersmith: The Calling of Morrigan Crow, Jack gives Morrigan a magical way to contact him in times of need, which Morrigan uses in the Ghastly Market.
Fenestra, nicknamed by Morrigan as Fen, is a giant cat, known as a Magnificat, who is also the head of housekeeping at the Hotel Deucalion. In the Wintersea Republic, Morrigan has seen Magnificats, however she is amazed upon her arrival at Nevermoor to learn that a specific few of them are sentient, and can actually talk. Fenestra also helps Morrigan during one of her trials.
Dame Chanda Kali is a singer who has taken up a permanent residence in the Hotel Deucalion. She is a friend of Jupiter, and Morrigan, upon her arrival in Nevermoor. She gives Morrigan advice and helps her along her path in the first book, and appears minimally in the next two installments. Her knack lets her control animals with her beautiful singing voice.
Cadence Blackburn is a mesmerist whom Morrigan first meets during the Chase Trial. In the trial, Cadence is knocked off her steed. Morrigan, who fears that Cadence will be trampled, goes against Fenestra's wishes and helps Cadence back on to her steed. However Cadence steals the prize from Morrigan, who comes to hate the girl. Morrigan encounters her again during the Fright Trial, and then at the Show Trial when both girls are accepted into the Wundrous Society and then become friends. Morrigan also rescues Cadence from the Ghastly Market, where she is about to be illegally sold. Being a mesmerist, Cadence is hardly ever remembered by the other members of Unit 919 until they get used to her spells, and only Morrigan is initially immune.
Noelle Devereaux is a young girl participating in the trials who is mean to both Cadence and Morrigan. Her patron is Baz Charlton, like Cadence, however unlike her teammate, she does not become a member of the Wundrous Society after the trials and becomes infuriated because of it. Noelle does not appear in books two and three.
Inspector Flintlock is a detective who is constantly trying to get Morrigan deported back to the Wintersea Republic throughout Nevermoor: The Trials of Morrigan Crow. Flintlock is stopped by Jupiter, who promises Elder Quinn that he will be able to find nine signatories to nullify Flintlock's charges, which he accomplishes in book two.
Baz Charlton is Cadence's patron who has been described as a "spaghetti patron" in the book due to the fact that he usually submits multiple contestant into the trials each year in the hopes that at least one of them will get into the Wundrous Society. He is a minor antagonist in the series.
Nan Dawson is Hawthorne's patron who appears as a minor character in all three books in the series so far.
Frank and Martha are two member of the staff of the Hotel Deucalion. Frank is a vampire dwarf in charge of cooking and party planning at the hotel, and Martha is a human who is a housemaid and a friend of Frank.
One concierge is named Kedgeree, and is an older man who takes a liking to Morrigan.
Other members of Unit 919 besides Morrigan, Hawthorne, and Cadence, who were introduced as minor characters in the first book, play major roles in the second and third books: 
Francis Fitzwilliams, a gastronomist. 
Mahir Ibrahim, a linguist who teaches the rest of the unit curse words in other languages.
Thaddea Macleod, a skilled fighter.
Lambeth Amara, a short-range oracle who was almost sold to the Ghastly Market and is really a citizen of the Wintersea Republic named Lamya Bethari Amati Ra. 
Anah Kahlo, a healer and doctor.
Archan Tate, a pickpocket who often impressed the other members of the group.

 Introduced in book 2 
Angel Israfel is a singer whose voice, if listened to, will make the rest of one's life seem anticlimactic. He serves as the ninth signatory for the papers that allow Morrigan to stay in Nevermoor, and was also captured by the Ghastly Market to be sold; however he escaped when Morrigan and Hawthorne brought down the establishment.
Marina Cheery is the conductor of Unit 919's hometrain which leads directly from their houses to the Wunsoc campus. She "lives up to her name," according to Morrigan. Though introduced in book two, Miss Cheery, as she has the members of the unit call her, also appears in book three as a sort of homeroom teacher for the students.
Hemingway Q. Onstald is a teacher in the Wundrous Society who is a Wunnimal, meaning he is part human and part animal. He has the shell of a tortoise, as well as being incredibly slow. Onstald tries to convince Morrigan that every single Wundersmith (in addition to herself) is evil and beyond saving; however he was wrong and closed-minded, and ended up sacrificing himself for Morrigan at the Ghastly Market. Onstald's knack is unknown, despite Morrigan believing it was Timekeeping. In reality, he learned the Wunderous art of Tempus at the Sub-Nine Acedemic Group, and his real knack is something mundane.
Five of Charlton's patrons in the society have formed the group of bullies called the Charlton Five, and they plague Morrigan throughout the second book in the series. Heliose and Alfie, two members of the group, have been named in the series. Alfie, whose knack allows him to breath underwater, was almost sold to the Ghastly Market, but was able to escape without his power.
Hawthorne's family, who appear in books two and three at Hallowmas and Christmas parades, respectively, and minor characters the story. The family includes patriarch Dave Swift, his wife, Cat Swift, their oldest daughter, Helena, their second child, Homer, who took a vow of silence at a young age and only speaks one day a year, communicating through writing the rest of the time instead, Hawthorn himself, and Davina, also known as Baby Dave, a toddler.
Mr. Mildmay is another teacher and a member of the Wundrous Society who teaches the members of Unit 919 in his class how to navigate the city of Nevermoor. The entire class warms up to him until he is revealed to be a minion of Ezra Squall, working to find Morrigan. Mr. Mildmay, or simply Mildmay, was teased by his unit for being weak and liking maps.

 Introduced in book 3 
Gavin Squires, a member of the Wundrous Society who likes animals, and Holliday Wu, a part of the Public Distraction Department, appear in Hollowpox: The Hunt for Morrigan Crow to gather a task force to hunt down the Nevermoorian Scaly Beast and to keep the public calm while doing this, respectively
Rook Rosenfeld is the Scholar Mistres of the School of Wundrous Arts
Conall is a student in the School of Wundrous Arts.
Sofia is a student in the School of Wundrous Arts who eventually succumbs to Hollowpox.
Laurent St. James is the leader of The Concerned Citizens of Nevermoor, who is unkind to Hollowpox-infected Wunimals and Morrigan in the press.
Maud Lowry is the president of the Wintersea Republic, where Morrigan lived. She is an antagonist in the third book.
In addition, multiple past Wundersmiths appear in visions Morrigan has through The Book of Ghostly Hours in the School of Wundrous Arts.

 Development 
Three books have been released so far. A fourth book was officially announced after the third one was released. Multiple publishing companies were vying for the rights to Townsend's book series, so Townsend eventually signed a deal with Hachette Book Group to write two more after the fourth one. But, according to Townsend, she has a plot planned for a total of nine books in the series. Multiple reviews have compared the fantasy book series to the Harry Potter book series. Newspaper Sydney Morning Herald has said The Nevermoor series has"move[d] into J. K. Rowling territory." Townsend has previously noted that J. K. Rowling and the Harry Potter  series were major inspirations to her writing. The cover art of the series is done by Beatriz Castro.

 Reception 
All the books in The Nevermoor series have been received well with rave reviews. On Goodreads, reviews have compared the plot—as well as Townsend's writing style in the books—to that of the Harry Potter book series. The same has been said about the books in a review on Common Sense Media. At the Australian Book Industry Awards in 2018, the Book of the Year Award was given to Nevermoor: The Trials of Morrigan Crow. The Premier's Award for best overall published work, as well as the Children's Award were both awarded to Nevermoor: The Trials of Morrigan Crow at the Adelaide Festival Awards for Literature. The second book, Wundersmith: The Calling of Morrigan Crow, has been noted as having "middle book syndrome," is it does not advance the plot as much as the other two books, but it still as enjoyable as them. However, upon the release of the book, Wundersmith was still met with good reviews on Goodreads and Amazon. Morrigan herself has gotten praise for being "at times timid, at times powerful, and always hungry for both affection and learning." Book three in the series, titled Hollowpox: The Hunt for Morrigan Crow, is "packed with all the magic, humour, and heart that readers have come to expect from the collection so far. It’s another home run for Townsend and her wonderfully crafted heroine," as a review on The AU read. Gilly Reads said the third book was "perfectly delivered" and "packed with adventure, mystery and turmoil." Hollowpox'' has also won the Waterstones Children's Book Prize in 2020. Critics have also praised Townsend's ability to "keep readers on edge for the duration of her book, hanging on every word."

Audiobooks 
In 2017, actress Gemma Whelan was tapped to adapt the entire series into the unabridged Audiobook format. She read all three books aloud, their lengths varying from 11 to 14 hours. Whelan "ably presents the funny and enticing tale of a "cursed" girl who avoids meeting her doom by escaping to a world where she encounters strange and miraculous people, creatures, and events" in her readings. Her English accent has also been praised, as well as her "talent for producing different voices, [which] will remind listeners of Jim Dale's performances of the Harry Potter series. She gives each voice a unique characteristic that brings each character to life."

References 

2017 books
Australian fantasy novels